Rhadinomyia luzonica is a species of insects, ulidiid or picture-winged fly in the genus Rhadinomyia of the family Ulidiidae.

References

Ulidiidae